Autheuil is the name or part of the name of the following communes in France:

 Autheuil, Eure-et-Loir, in the Eure-et-Loir department
 Autheuil, Orne, in the Orne department
 Autheuil-Authouillet, in the Eure department
 Autheuil-en-Valois, in the Oise department

See also
 Auteuil (disambiguation)